Mongla Export Processing Zone or Mongla EPZ is one of the eight export processing zones under the Bangladesh Export Processing Zone Authority (BEPZA). It is located in Mongla and is adjacent to the Port of Mongla.

History
Mongla Export Processing Zone was inaugurated by then-Prime Minister Sheikh Hasina on 23 May 1998. The zone has received investment from 29 companies as of 2015, of which 16 have gone into production and rest are under construction. The zone has faced criticism for housing some environmentally harmful industries. Mongla EPZ performance has been below government expectations.

See also
 Bangladesh Export Processing Zone Authority

References

External links
 

Bagerhat District
Mongla
Foreign trade of Bangladesh